Mohamad Zamri bin Ramli (born 23 November 1990) is Malaysian footballer who formerly played for Kelantan FA as a left full back in the Malaysia Super League.

Early life
Zamri was born in Kampung Puyu, which is a village in the district of Rantau Panjang, Kelantan. His family originated from Kampung Mundok, a Malay village, located in a town in southern Thailand, which was between Golok town. He has dual citizenship of Malaysia and Thailand. He received his early education in Sekolah Rendah Agama in Pasir Mas, Kelantan. Since that he always participate in Minor Championships Mundok District, Southern Thailand. After returning to Kelantan, he represented his school. His talent is detected, and called to play with Majlis Sukan Sekolah-Sekolah Agama Kelantan.

Club career

Kelantan President Cup Team
In 2008, he was selected to represent the Kelantan President Cup Team. He won the hearts of selection panel headed by Shamsuddin and Che Awang Saupi. At the time, they are Kelantan President Cup Team coach. In 2009, he and his teammates won the Youth Cup. He was a key player in the team.

Kelantan
After seasons with Kelantan President Cup Team, his talent more shine when selected for training with the Kelantan senior squad. Possessed talent and determination he has managed to win the hearts Head Coach of Kelantan Peter James Butler and being promoted into the main squad. He gave quite a convincing action during preseason preparations in 2009.

Suspended from playing
The Football Association of Malaysia punished Zamri Ramli with a two-year suspension after he was found guilty of taking the drug methamphetamine for the FA Cup final against Johor Darul Takzim in June 2013.

Club statistics

Club

References

External links
 Mohamad Zamri Ramli at SoccerPunter.com
 
 

1990 births
Living people
Malaysian footballers
Kelantan FA players
People from Kelantan
Association football defenders